Aliaj is an Albanian surname. Notable people with the surname include:

Adrian Aliaj (born 1976), Albanian footballer
Hysland Aliaj (born 1991), Albanian footballer
Kevin Aliaj
Shahin Aliaj (born 1996), Albanian footballer
Toni Aliaj

Albanian-language surnames